Mulgund or Mulagunda is a panchayat town in Gadag district in the Indian state of Karnataka.

Geography
It has an average elevation of 675 metres (2214 feet).

Demographics
 India census, Mulgund had a population of 18,077. Males constitute 51% of the population and females 49%. Mulgund has an average literacy rate of 53%, lower than the national average of 59.5%: male literacy is 63%, and female literacy is 42%. In Mulgund, 15% of the population is under 6 years of age.

Importance
Mulgund was the capital city of Mulgund 12 province. Mulgund is famous for the ancient Siddeshwara temple, Shobhaneshwara temple, Nagareshwara Temple and chaya chandranath jain temple that is on hill and unique.

References

Cities and towns in Gadag district